Goethe Glacier is a small glacier located in the Sierra Nevada Range in the John Muir Wilderness of Sierra National Forest in the U.S. state of California. The glacier is northwest of Mount Goethe.

See also
List of glaciers in the United States

References

Glaciers of California
Glaciers of the Sierra Nevada (United States)
Glaciers of Fresno County, California